Polaria is the world's most northerly aquarium. It is located in Tromsø, in northern Norway.

Rather than a mainly scientific aquarium such as the one in Bergen in the Norwegian midlands, Polaria, which opened in May 1998, is designed to be an educational experience, with particular emphasis on displays for children.

Most of the displays focus on the northerly islands of Svalbard. There is a five-screen panoramic cinema, an "Arctic Walkway" area containing displays of polar exploration equipment, stuffed animals and simulated permafrost, many conventional aquaria displaying local marine life as well as open tanks and display tanks containing rock-shore animals, baby fish and other child-friendly exhibits. Its centerpiece is an open pool containing a group of bearded seals, Erignathus barbatus. These are trained and there are regular displays, as much to keep the animals active and healthy as for public entertainment. The seal enclosure has observation blisters set into its sides, so that visitors can look up at the animals from underneath, and a submerged walkway in a transparent tunnel across the bottom, allowing close access to the animals in their natural environment.

The building itself is also worthy of note. Its striking design represents ice floes that have been pressed up on land by the rough seas of the Arctic. This attractive piece of modern architecture echoes the Arctic Cathedral across the harbour in Tromsdalen on the mainland.

One of Norway's most famous and successful seal hunting ships, the Polstjerna (T-80-T) has been preserved in a separate museum building less than a hundred metres away from Polaria. Tickets to the ship museum can be bought from Polaria.

External links
Polaria homepage

Museums in Troms og Finnmark
Natural history museums in Norway
Education and research in Tromsø
Buildings and structures in Tromsø
Aquaria in Norway
Museums established in 1998
Articles needing infobox zoo